Bağpınar Kuyucak is a village in the Adıyaman District, Adıyaman Province, Turkey. The village had a population of 227 in 2021.

The hamlets of Çiçek and Gazihan are attached to the village.

References 

Villages in Adıyaman District
Kurdish settlements in Adıyaman Province